Dinefwr was one of six local government districts of the county of Dyfed, Wales from 1974 to 1996. It was named after Dinefwr Castle which in the middle ages had been the court of the House of Dinefwr and one of the three principal royal courts of Wales with Aberffraw and Shrewsbury.

History
The district was formed on 1 April 1974 under the Local Government Act 1972, covering the area of five former districts from the administrative county of Carmarthenshire, which were abolished at the same time:
Ammanford Urban District
Cwmamman Urban District
Llandeilo Rural District
Llandeilo Urban District
Llandovery Municipal Borough
The district held borough status, allowing the chair of the council to take the title of mayor.

Dinefwr borough was abolished 22 years later under the Local Government (Wales) Act 1994, with the area becoming part of the new Carmarthenshire unitary authority on 1 April 1996.

Political control
The first election to the council was held in 1973, initially operating as a shadow authority before coming into its powers on 1 April 1974. Political control of the council from 1974 until the council's abolition in 1996 was held by the following parties:

Elections
 1973 Dinefwr Borough Council election
 1976 Dinefwr Borough Council election
 1979 Dinefwr Borough Council election
 1983 Dinefwr Borough Council election
 1987 Dinefwr Borough Council election (new ward boundaries)
 1991 Dinefwr Borough Council election

Premises

The council had its headquarters at the Municipal Offices at 30 Crescent Road, Llandeilo, which had previously been the offices of Llandeilo Rural District Council. It also used Ammanford Town Hall as an area office.

See also
Dinefwr Park
Dinefwr Castle
House of Dinefwr

References

Politics of Carmarthenshire
1974 establishments in Wales
1996 disestablishments in Wales
Dyfed